Dornakal Assembly constituency is a ST reserved constituency of Telangana Legislative Assembly, India. This region is occupied by more scheduled tribes in highest number. It is one of 12 constituencies in combined Warangal district, and one of the constituencies of Mahabubabad district. It is part of Mahabubabad Lok Sabha constituency.

Redya Naik is the current MLA of the constituency.

Mandals
The Assembly Constituency presently comprises the following Mandals:

Members of Legislative Assembly

Election results

Telangana Legislative Assembly election, 2018

Telangana Legislative Assembly election, 2014

See also
 List of constituencies of Telangana Legislative Assembly

References

Assembly constituencies of Telangana
Hanamkonda district